Flying Dutchman Records was an American jazz record label, which was owned by music industry executive, producer and songwriter Bob Thiele.

History 
Initially distributed by Atlantic Records, Thiele made a five-album deal in 1972 with Mega Records to issue five albums in the Flying Dutchman Series. The deal was not renewed and distribution shifted to RCA Records, which took over the label in 1976.
The label released albums until 1984 when Thiele established Doctor Jazz Records.
Some of the musicians who recorded several albums for the label include singer Leon Thomas, saxophonist Gato Barbieri, arranger Oliver Nelson, saxophonist Tom Scott and pianist Lonnie Liston Smith. Gil Scott-Heron released three albums for the label, including his debut Small Talk at 125th and Lenox and Free Will.

Flying Dutchman had three sublabels, Amsterdam, BluesTime, and Contact.

Flying Dutchman is independently owned and since 2011 has been distributed and marketed by Ace Records.

Discography

10100 Series
Flying Dutchman Records commenced releasing LPs in 1969 with the 10100 Series that continued until 1973.

BluesTime Series
In 1969 Flying Dutchman established the BluesTime label to record blues music issuing ten albums between 1969 and 1970.

Amsterdam
The Amsterdam subsidiary label was established in 1970 and concentrated of popular music including the recordings of Thiele’s wife Teresa Brewer.

Reggae Series
In 1970 Flying Dutchman established the Reggae label to record reggae music issuing four albums.

Mega Records
Five albums produced under the Flying Dutchman Productions banner were released by the Mega label in 1972

RCA Distributed Series
Starting in 1974, Flying Dutchman albums were released and distributed by RCA using their numbering system.

References

External links
Discogs

American record labels
Jazz record labels
 
 
Atlantic Records
RCA Records